John Edye FRS (7 August 1789 – 1 March 1873) was the talented Chief Clerk in the Surveyor of the Navy's Office during the 19th century.  He invented a new means of construction for wooden warships and produced the detail for the Surveyor William Symonds's many designs.  Together he and Symonds created larger and larger wooden warships for the Royal Navy, which were able not only to defeat an enemy by weight of fire (as the Navy had long been able to do) but also to pursue them and force battle.

Edye was elected a Fellow of the Royal Society on 5 February 1835.

Footnotes

External links
John Edye's Calculations Relating to the Equipment, Displacement, Etc. of Ships and Vessels of War, 1832, MS 546 held by Special Collections & Archives, Nimitz Library at the United States Naval Academy

History of the Royal Navy
British naval architects
1789 births
1873 deaths
Fellows of the Royal Society
19th-century British businesspeople